Gu Family Book (also known as Kang Chi, the Beginning) is a 2013 South Korean television series starring Lee Seung-gi and Bae Suzy. The fusion martial arts action historical drama is about a half-man half-monster who is searching for a centuries-old book that according to gumiho legend, contains the secret to becoming human.

Filmed at MBC Dramia in Gyeonggi Province, the series aired on MBC from April 8 to June 25, 2013, on Mondays and Tuesdays at 21:55 for 24 episodes.

Synopsis
After their nobleman father is unfairly accused of being a traitor and killed, Yoon Seo-hwa (Lee Yeon-hee), her younger brother Jung-yoon (Lee David) and their maid Dam (Kim Bo-mi) are sent to a gisaeng house. Seo-hwa's first "patron" is Jo Gwan-woong (Lee Sung-jae), the man who betrayed and killed her father. Before Jo Gwan-woong arrives, Dam swaps clothes with Seo-hwa so that she can run away, chased by Gwan-woong's men. Gu Wol-ryung (Choi Jin-hyuk), a mystical forest protector and gumiho, finds Seo-hwa unconscious and, as he had fallen in love with her, protects her. When Seo-hwa wakes up, she too falls in love with him and marries him after he tells her that both Dam and Jung-yoon were able to run away and are safe. In actuality, Jung-yoon has been hanged, whereas Dam has committed suicide. Wol-ryung, unable to tell her the truth, lied to her and did not tell her that he is a gumiho.

Wol-ryung decides to become human in order to be with Seo-hwa. To do so, he must live 100 days without showing his true form to a human, without taking a life, and must help anyone that needs aid. But if he fails, he'll lose any chance of ever becoming human, and will become a demon for the next thousand years. Wol-ryung successfully lives most of these days following these rules, but one day, Gwan-woong's men find Seo-hwa alone in the forest. Wol-ryung rushes to help her and reveals his true form, massacring the soldiers. Seo-hwa, horrified, leaves him, and he is later killed by the righteous soldier Dam Pyeong-joon (Jo Sung-ha), who had been told that the gumiho was murdering innocents. Seo-hwa soon discovers that she is with Wol-ryung's child and gives birth to a son. Realizing that the baby isn't a monster and regretting her betrayal to Wol-ryung, Seo-hwa entrusts the baby in the care of a monk, So-jung (Kim Hee-won). She then confronts Gwan-woong, but is killed.

The infant is adopted by nobleman Park Mu-sol (Um Hyo-sup) and grows up as Choi Kang-chi (Lee Seung-gi), ostensibly the son of Lord Park's servant Choi (Kim Dong-kyun), but raised as part of the Park family. Though Mu-sol's wife Lady Yoon (Kim Hee-jung) never warmed up to him, Lord Park loves Kang-chi like his own son, and he is close to the siblings Tae-seo (Yoo Yeon-seok) and Chung-jo (Lee Yu-bi), whom he loves even though she is betrothed to another. Kang-chi is notorious in the village as a troublemaker, but he is good-hearted and loyal, and beloved by the servants at the Hundred Year Inn, which the Park family runs. However, Jo Gwan-woong returns to the village. He believes the wealthy Lord Park has hidden treasure inside the inn and, in his scheme to take over it, Lord Park is killed defending Kang-chi. Gwan-woong throws Tae-seo and his mother in jail, and Chung-jo is sold as a gisaeng and convinced to use her beauty and wile to someday gain power and revenge. After Kang-chi promises Lady Yoon that he will take care of the Park siblings, she makes a futile attempt to stab Gwan-woong and is killed. Meanwhile, Gwan-woong becomes intrigued by Kang-chi and his seemingly superhuman strength.

In the meantime, Dam Yeo-wool (Bae Suzy) and Gon (Sung Joon) had been dispatched to the village by her father, now martial arts master Dam Pyeong-joon, to investigate a series of murders they suspect Gwan-woong is responsible for. Yeo-wool witnesses the events that befall the Park family, and instinctively helps Kang-chi when he is hunted by Gwan-woong's soldiers. During a fight, a soldier slices off Kang-chi's beaded bracelet, which was used to contain his powers. Kang-chi transforms into a half-human half-beast and easily defeats his enemies. So-jung later tells Kang-chi the truth about his origins, including the mystical and elusive Gu Family Book, which holds the secret to becoming fully human.

Kang-chi is taken under the wing of Yi Sun-sin (Yoo Dong-geun), a naval commander. Yi Sun-sin, Master Dam, and the late Lord Park were part of a secret group protecting the Joseon nation against foreign invasions. Yi places Kang-chi in the martial arts school run by Master Dam, there he is trained physically and mentally and learns to control his transformations. After discovering that under the man clothes there's a girl, Kang-chi gradually falls in love with Yeo-wool, and vice versa. But several obstacles remain in their way: the continuing villainy of Gwan-woong; the knowledge that it was Yeo-wool's father who killed Kang-chi's father; the reappearance of Wol-ryung who has turned into a soul-sucking demon with no memories who can only be killed by his son; and Sojung's warning that Yeo-wool is fated to die if she stays by the side of the man she meets beneath the blossoming peach tree under a crescent moon, which is none other than Kang-chi himself.

Cast

Main
Lee Seung-gi as Choi Kang-chi
Jung Joon-won as young Choi Kang-chi
A half-man, half-gumiho who longs to become fully human. He originally loved Chung-jo, but soon slowly fell in love with Yeo-Wool.
Bae Suzy as Dam Yeo-wool 
A martial arts instructor at her father's school, she is particularly skilled with a bow and arrow. When she was younger, Kang-chi saved her from being attacked by a dog and she never forgot about him. She then falls in love with him when they meet again. She also accepts Kang-chi for who he is inside even though he is a divine creature that many people are afraid of.
Sung Joon as Gon 
He has a one-sided love for Yeo-wool, for whom he serves as a bodyguard. He also has a bickering relationship with Kang-chi.
Lee Yu-bi as Park Chung-jo 
Kang-chi's first love. She is promised off to someone in marriage in order to sustain the family-owned-inn's longevity, hence the reason she originally first began spurning Kang-chi's open display of emotions towards her. After the family tragedy, she is forced to become a gisaeng. She makes a pact with Kang-chi that he should come and take her away from her current place once he has proven Lord Park's innocence.
Yoo Yeon-seok as Park Tae-seo
A cool-headed, responsible scholar who helps his father Mu-sol run their inn. He comes under a hypnotism that makes him think Kang-chi murdered his father, testing the bonds of their friendship and brotherhood.

Supporting
Choi Jin-hyuk as Gu Wol-ryung 
Kang-chi's father. He is the guardian spirit of Mt. Jiri, and falls in love with a human.
Yoon Se-ah as Yoon Seo-hwa (ep 14-21)
Lee Yeon-hee as young Yoon Seo-hwa (ep 1-2, 21) 
Kang-chi's mother. She is the daughter of a nobleman who becomes a gisaeng after her father is framed for treason and killed.
She returns years later disguised as a Japanese lady Ja Hong-myung, and secretly plans her revenge against Jo Gwan-woong.
Lee Sung-jae as Jo Gwan-woong 
A villainous nobleman. He lusted after Seo-hwa, then framed and killed her father, destroying many lives. He is now the mastermind behind a string of murders and a traitorous plan against Joseon, and hunts down Kang-chi.
Um Hyo-sup as Park Mu-sol 
A just and righteous nobleman, Lord Park is beloved by his countrymen, and is the father of Tae-seo and Chung-jo. When he finds the orphaned baby Kang-chi inside a basket floating in a river, he takes him in and becomes his surrogate father.
Jo Sung-ha as Dam Pyeong-joon 
A former soldier, and now a martial arts master. Yeo-wool's father.
Jung Hye-young as Chun Soo-ryun – The head gisaeng.
Yoo Dong-geun as Yi Sun-sin – A patriotic naval commander with secret plans for building turtle ships that could aid in fighting against invading Japanese warships.
Kim Hee-won as So-jung – A Buddhist monk who was Wol-ryung's friend, and now watches over Kang-chi.
Lee Do-kyung as Teacher Gong-dal – A wise old teacher at Master Dam's martial arts school.
Jo Jae-yoon as Ma Bong-chul – A local gangster whose life is spared by Kang-chi, and becomes loyal to him.
Kim Dong-kyun as Choi – Lord Park's servant and Kang-chi's adoptive father.
Jin Kyung as Yeo-joo – Yeo-wool's teacher in domestic skills, who has a crush on Gon.
Kim Ki-bang as Eok-man – Kang-chi's friend.
Kim Sung-hoon as Wol-dae – Jo Gwan-woong's chief minion.
Son Ga-young as Wol-sun – A gisaeng who becomes jealous of Chung-jo, bullying and sabotaging her.
Kim Hee-jung as Lady Yoon – Mu-sol's wife who resents Kang-chi.
David Lee McInnis as Kageshima
Song Young-kyu as Pil-mok – Seo-hwa's assistant.
Park Joo-hyung as Han Noh
Nam Hyun-joo as chief maid at the gibang
Lee David as Yoon Jung-yoon – Seo-hwa's younger brother (ep 1)
Kim Bo-mi as Dam – Seo-hwa's maid (ep 1)

Original soundtrack

Ratings

Awards and nominations

References

External links
 Gu Family Book official MBC website 
  
 
 
 Kang Chi, the Beginning at MBC Global Media

2013 South Korean television series debuts
2013 South Korean television series endings
MBC TV television dramas
Japanese invasions of Korea (1592–1598) in fiction
Korean-language television shows
Television series set in the Joseon dynasty
South Korean fantasy television series
Television shows written by Kang Eun-kyung
South Korean historical television series
Cultural depictions of Yi Sun-sin
Television series by Samhwa Networks